Bhaskar is both a given name and a surname. Notable people with the name include:

People
Bhāskara I (c. 600 – c. 680), Indian mathematician, Bhaskaracharya 
 Bhaskara II (1114–1185), Indian mathematician and astronomer
Bhaskarbuwa Bakhale (1869–1922), Indian classical vocalist
Bhaskar Chandavarkar (1936–2009), Indian sitar player
Bhaskar Chandavarkar (1936–2009), Indian sitar player
Bhaskar Jyoti Mahanta (born: 1963), Indian police officer
Bhaskar Menon, music industry executive of Indian origin
Bhaskar Pramanik, present Chairman of Microsoft India
Bhaskar Sunkara, American publisher
Bhaskar Ramchandra Tambe(1874–1941), Marathi poet from India
Bommarillu Bhaskar, known mononymically as Bhaskar, Indian Telugu film director
K. Vijaya Bhaskar, Indian Telugu film director
Kola Bhaskar, Indian film editor
M. Bhaskar, also known as Oscar Movies Bhaskar, Indian Tamil film director & producer
M. S. Baskar, Indian actor
Roy Bhaskar, British philosopher
Sanjeev Bhaskar, British comedian and actor
V. Bhaskar, Indian economist
Vijaya Bhaskar, Kannada music director

Other uses
Dainik Bhaskar, a Hindi-language daily newspaper of India, website bhaskar.com
Bhaskar Group, an Indian business conglomerate

See also
Bhaskar Nagar, a village in the state of Andhra Pradesh, India
Bhaskar Bharti, a television serial that airs on Sony Entertainment Television
Divya Bhaskar, a Gujarati-language daily newspaper of India
Bhaskar Jagannathan syndrome, a genetic disorder